Sergio Alejandro Quiroga Gabutti (born 7 June 1994) is an Argentine professional footballer who plays as a forward for Sarmiento.

Career
Quiroga began his career in the system of Argentinos Juniors. On 2 July 2015, Quiroga joined Primera B Metropolitana side Brown on loan. He made his professional bow during a fixture away to Deportivo Español, which preceded his first goal arriving two matches later against Deportivo Riestra on 23 September; which was scored via a strike from inside his own half, into an empty net after their opponents goalkeeper went up for a corner. He returned to his parent club in December, having made seven appearances for the Adrogué team. San Miguel of Primera C Metropolitana signed Quiroga in January 2016, on a six-month loan.

In August 2016, Quiroga completed a permanent move to Sarmiento. He featured twice as the club were relegated to Primera B Nacional in 2016–17. Quiroga scored on his fourteenth tier two game for Sarmiento, coming off the bench for Guillermo Farré before netting their second in a 0–2 victory over Almagro on 28 September 2018.

Career statistics
.

Honours
Brown
Primera B Metropolitana: 2015

References

External links

1994 births
Living people
People from Charata
Argentine footballers
Association football forwards
Primera B Metropolitana players
Argentine Primera División players
Primera Nacional players
Argentinos Juniors footballers
Club Atlético Brown footballers
Club Atlético San Miguel footballers
Club Atlético Sarmiento footballers
Sportspeople from Chaco Province